Douglas Lake, Michigan may refer to:

 Douglas Lake (Cheboygan County, Michigan)
 Douglas Lake (Otsego County, Michigan), Otsego County, Michigan